The mixed relay biathlon competition at the 2020 Winter Youth Olympics was held on 15 January at the Les Tuffes Nordic Centre.

Results
The race was started at 10:30.

References

Mixed relay